Petr Horák (born 7 September 1991) is a Czech snowboarder. He competed in the 2018 Winter Olympics.

References

1991 births
Living people
Snowboarders at the 2018 Winter Olympics
Czech male snowboarders
Olympic snowboarders of the Czech Republic
Universiade gold medalists for the Czech Republic
Universiade medalists in snowboarding
Competitors at the 2015 Winter Universiade